John Warren Davis may refer to:

 John Warren Davis (judge) (1867–1945), New Jersey legislator and judge, Third Circuit Court of Appeals
 John Warren Davis (college president) (1888–1980), African American educator, college administrator, and civil rights leader

See also
 John Davis (disambiguation)
 John W. Davis (disambiguation)
 Warren Davis (disambiguation)